Syntagma is a station on the Athens Metro, located at Syntagma Square in the center of Athens, Greece. It serves as the transfer point between Line 3, Line 2 and the Athens Tram. When the Metro first opened, on 28 January 2000, the station was the terminal station for both the new lines. The centerpiece of the city's metro network, it is a transportation hub for buses and the northern terminal for the Tram. It is the busiest station in the Athens transport system, located underneath Syntagma Square, the political centre of Athens. It serves Ermou Street (the main shopping street in the historic centre), the Houses of Parliament, various government agencies, foreign embassies and the National Garden.

Several of the architecture works were erected by Thodoros Papadimitriou, a famous sculptor and the station also includes a large archeological exhibition.

Tram stop

The tram stop of the same name is located south of Syntagma Square, adjacent to Vasilissis Amalias Avenue: it opened on 19 July 2004, as part of the initial scheme for the 2004 Summer Olympics. The tram stop was a single-track terminus with a side platform until 10 December 2018, and reopened on 14 March 2018 with a dual-track layout and an island platform.

The tram stop previously served Lines 4 and 5.

Station layout

Exits

Cultural works
 George Zoggolopoulos: Atrium (a ceiling installation by the front of the eastbound Line 3 platform)
 Theodoros, sculptor http://www.theodoros.net/ergo/ergomain.htm : The Metro Clock, 2001 (at the main hall)

References

External links

Athens Metro stations
Athens Tram stops
Railway stations opened in 2000
2000 establishments in Greece